Lithuania competed at the 2016 Winter Youth Olympics in Lillehammer, Norway from 12 to 21 February 2016.

Lithuania was represented by 10 athletes: Nadiežda Derendiajeva, Vitalija Kutkauskaitė and Linas Banys in biathlon, Rokas Vaitkus in cross-country skiing, Andrejus Driukarovas and Eglė Augustaitytė in alpine skiing, Dino Mukovozas in ice hockey, Aras Arlauskas in snowboarding, Guostė Damulevičiūtė and Deividas Kizala in figure skating.

Alpine skiing

Boys

Girls

Biathlon

Boys

Girls

Mixed

Cross-country skiing

Boys

Figure skating

Couples

Mixed NOC team trophy

Ice hockey

Snowboarding

Snowboard cross

Snowboard and ski cross relay

Qualification legend: FA – Qualify to medal round; FB – Qualify to consolation round

See also
Lithuania at the 2016 Summer Olympics

References

Nations at the 2016 Winter Youth Olympics
Lithuania at the Youth Olympics
2016 in Lithuanian sport